Karen Murphy is an American film producer. She frequently collaborates with writer/director Christopher Guest.

Films 
She was a producer in all films unless otherwise noted.

Film

Television

References

External links 
 

Living people
American film producers
Place of birth missing (living people)
Year of birth missing (living people)